Classic Christmas is an album of Christmas music recorded by country music artist George Strait. It was released by MCA Nashville on October 7, 2008. The album was previously released in 2006 under the title Fresh Cut Christmas and was available exclusively at Hallmark Gold Crown stores.

All songs in public domain.

Track listing

Charts

Weekly charts

Year-end charts

References

2008 Christmas albums
George Strait albums
MCA Records albums
Albums produced by Tony Brown (record producer)
Christmas albums by American artists
Country Christmas albums
Covers albums